Achucallani (possibly from Aymara achuqalla weasel, -ni a suffix to indicate ownership, "the one with a weasel (or weasels)") is a mountain in the Andes of southern Peru, about  high. It is situated in the Moquegua Region, Mariscal Nieto Province, Torata District. Achucallani lies southwest of Humajalso, Iruma and Surehuayco.

References

Mountains of Moquegua Region
Mountains of Peru